Gonospira holostoma is a species of air-breathing land snail, terrestrial pulmonate gastropod mollusk in the family Streptaxidae.

This species is endemic to Mauritius.

References

Gonospira
Gastropods described in 1875
Taxonomy articles created by Polbot
Endemic fauna of Mauritius